Großherzogin Elisabeth may refer to:

Sailing ships

Duchesse Anne (former German ship Großherzogin Elisabeth, built in 1901)
Großherzogin Elisabeth (ship) (German sail training ship, built in 1909 as San Antonio)

People

Princess Elisabeth of Saxe-Altenburg (1826–1896) (Grand Duchess of Oldenburg)
Duchess Elisabeth Alexandrine of Mecklenburg-Schwerin (1869–1955, Grand Duchess of Oldenburg)